Franz Beyer may refer to:
Franz Beyer (musicologist) (1922–2018), German musicologist
Franz Beyer (general) (1892–1968), German World War II general
Franz Beyer (pilot) (1918–1944), German World War II fighter pilot